Our Puzzling Encounters Considered is the second album by Psyopus, released on February 20, 2007.

Track listing
 The Pig Keeper's Daughter – 3:34
 2 – 4:00
 Scissor Fuck Paper Doll – 3:36
 Whore Meet Liar – 1:54
 Insects – 3:16
 Imogen's Puzzle pt. 2 – 4:25
 Play Some Skynyrd – 0:32
 Kill Us – 4:52
 Siobhan's Song – 6:43
 Happy Valentine's Day – 3:11
 Our Puzzling Encounters Considered – 1:55
 Untitled Track – 0:06
 Untitled Track – 27:54

At 21:31 on the second "Untitled Track" there is a very comical cover of "Catalepsy" by The Red Chord.

Personnel 
Adam 'King Auggie' Frappolli – vocals
Christopher 'Arpmandude' Arp – guitars
Fred Decoste – bass
Jon Cole – drums

All music and lyrics written by Psyopus

Engineered by Doug White
Produced by Psyopus and Doug White
Mastered by Doug White at Watchmen Studios
Packaging Artwork and design by Aaron Burto for Hell on Earth / K.O.M.S
Live photos by Taylorwithat
Interlude to "Imogen's Puzzle pt. 2" recorded by CJ St. Clair at Push Smack Studios.
Backing vocals on "Whore Meet Liar" by Karen Schiffmacher.

2007 albums
Psyopus albums
Albums recorded at Watchmen Recording Studios